The Eureka is a privately owned  gauge steam locomotive based in Las Vegas, Nevada. It is one of three preserved Baldwin class 8/18 C  locomotives in the United States, of which it is the only operable example. It is listed on the United States National Register of Historic Places.

History 
The locomotive was built by Baldwin Locomotive Works of Philadelphia, Pennsylvania in 1875 for the Eureka & Palisade Railroad in Nevada, which was built to transport passengers and goods from the mining town of Eureka to connect with the Central Pacific Railroad in Palisade.  The engine served on this railroad until 1896, when it was sold to the Sierra Nevada Wood and Lumber Company.  It operated on the Sierra Nevada Wood and Lumber until 1938 when the company dissolved and the engine was sold to a scrap dealer.

Warner Bros. bought the engine in 1939, and it was featured in many films, such as Torrid Zone, Cheyenne Autumn, and The Great Train Robbery.  The Eurekas last film appearance was in the 1976 film, The Shootist. In 1978, the California State Railroad Museum was in the process of restoring North Pacific Coast no. 12 Sonoma, another 8/18C class 4-4-0 nearly identical to the Eureka.  The museum had the latter stripped down to reveal its original paint scheme, and used it as a guide for restoring the former. The Eureka was later sold to Old Vegas, an amusement park in Henderson, Nevada, where it was placed on display in 1980. In 1985, a fire occurred at Old Vegas, with a burning building collapsing on the Eureka, badly damaging the engine.

A year later, the engine was discovered by Las Vegas attorney Dan Markoff, who purchased it and restored it to operating condition with the help of his father. The restored Eureka debuted at Railfair '91 at the California State Railroad Museum.  It was then operated on U.S. Gypsum's private tracks in Plaster City, California, in 1993. The locomotive was listed as a structure on the National Register of Historic Places on January 12, 1995 and was the first transportation listing in Las Vegas.

In 1997, Eureka was transported to Chama, New Mexico, for a series of operational excursions over the Cumbres and Toltec Scenic Railroad in late June.  The engine continues to make appearances at various narrow gauge tourist railroads during special events, such as the Cumbres and Toltec, Durango and Silverton Narrow Gauge Railroad, the Nevada State Railroad Museum, and the Nevada Southern Railroad Museum among others.  When the engine is not participating in such events, it is kept stored in Markoff's specially constructed shed, which is not open to the public.  Dan Markoff is rather cautious as to how often the engine operates, and does not intend to have the engine operating regularly as the engine still retains its original boiler and several other components.

References 

Transportation in the Las Vegas Valley
4-4-0 locomotives
Individual locomotives of the United States
Railway locomotives on the National Register of Historic Places in Nevada
National Register of Historic Places in Clark County, Nevada
Baldwin locomotives
3 ft gauge locomotives
Preserved steam locomotives of Nevada